Soluk may refer to:
 Soluk, East Azerbaijan
 Soluk, West Azerbaijan
 Soluk Rural District, in East Azerbaijan Province